Camelia Liparoti (born 11 July 1968) is an Italian rally raid racer. She won the FIM Women's Cross-Country Rallies World Cup six times between 2009 and 2014, the most by any rider.

Biography

Liparoti competed at the Dakar Rally from 2009 to 2017 in the quads class. For 2018 she switched to the UTV class, finishing 5th. With her participation in the 2021 Dakar Rally, Liparoti participated in her 13th consecutive Dakar. Just in 2021 her first podium in the final standing arrives with the second place in the T3 Light Prototypes category.

Dakar Rally

References

External links
 Camelia Liparoti at Dakar.com

1968 births
Living people
Italian motorcycle racers
Enduro riders
People from Livorno
Off-road motorcycle racers
Dakar Rally motorcyclists
Female motorcycle racers